Peddibhotla Subbaramaiah (1938 - 18 May 2018)  was a Telugu short-story writer from Vijayawada. His short story collection Peddibhotia Subbaramaiah Kathalu (Vol. 1) was selected for Sahitya Akademi Award in Telugu for 2012.

Early life 

Subbaramaiah was born in Guntur in 1938, the son of a railway station master. He went to school in Ongole. For college he came to Vijayawada and became a student of Viswanatha Satyanaryana, the author of Veyipadagalu, and a lecturer of SRR and CVR College.

Subbaramaiah served as a lecturer in Andhra Loyola College for 40 years and retired in December 1996.

He started writing in 1959.  "The plight, and the jealousies of the middle class are the raw material of my stories", he says.

The author has written more than 200 stories.

Works 

 His first novel "Dhruva tara" was published in the weekly Andhra Patrika. He later wrote stories and two novels for Bharati magazine.
 Peddibhotia Subbaramaiah Kathalu (Vol. 1)
 Peddibhotla Subbaramaiah Kathalu – 2

Awards 

 Ravi Sastry Smaraka Sahitya Nidhi
 Gopichand Memorial
 Appajosyula Vishnubhotla Kandalam Foundation Award.
 Sahitya Akademi Award in Telugu, 2012

References 

1938 births
2018 deaths
Telugu writers
Recipients of the Sahitya Akademi Award in Telugu
Writers from Vijayawada
20th-century Indian short story writers